Gentofte Town Hall (Danish: Gentofte Rådhus) is the administrative centre of Gentofte Municipality in the northern suburbs of Copenhagen, Denmark. Gentofte Fire Station is situated next to the town hall.

History

Gentofte's former town hall was from 1903. It was located at the corner of L.E. Bruunsvej and Rådhusvej and had already been too small 15 years after it was inaugurated.

In 1934, the civil parish of Gentofte (Gentofte Sognekommune) obtained a status similar to that of a market town.  Gentofte's first mayor became colonel Parkov. It was decided to build a new town hall and the architect Thorvald Jørgensen was selected for the project. A site on Bernstorffsvej  was selected for the new building. It had become free after a farm, Maltegården, had been destroyed in a fire a few years earlier.

 
The new town hall was inaugurated on 17 December 1936. The inauguration was attended by prime minister Thorvald Stauning. It was initially surrounded by fields but they were soon built over with single family detached homes. Up through the 1930s, Gentofte's population grew from 46,000 to 75,000 residents. In 1944 the town hall had once again become too small and was there expanded with a new north wing. The municipal administration continued to grow up through the 1950s. In 1976 Gentofte Town Hall was expanded with a new south wing.

Architecture
 
Gentofte Town Hall is designed in the Neoclassical style.

Water feature
In the space in front of the town hall stands a water feature. It was created by Allan Smidt and was inaugurated on 1 October 1978. It is an abstract sculpture with two organic figures and consists of circa 500 glazed ceramic tiles in white, blue and reddish-brown colours. The tallest figure is 2.5 metres tall. The sculpture was created in collaboration with Royal Copenhagen.

Today
Gentofte Town Hall is home to Gentofte Municipal Council as well as the municipal administration. It is also used for exhibitions and concerts.

References

External links

 Source

City and town halls in Copenhagen
City and town halls in Denmark
Buildings and structures in Gentofte Municipality
1937 establishments in Denmark
Government buildings completed in 1936